Mecas marginella is a species of longhorn beetles found in the United States. It was described by John Eatton Le Conte in 1873.

References

Saperdini
Beetles described in 1873